Nuclear interaction length is the mean distance travelled by a hadronic particle before undergoing an inelastic nuclear interaction.

See also
Nuclear collision length
Radiation length

External links
Particle Data Group site

Experimental particle physics